Saint Francis of Assisi College (SFAC) is a system of private, Catholic-oriented but non-sectarian Philippine educational institutions, offering complete education from pre-school up to the graduate or mistral level of education. The main campus is situated in Las Piñas, Metro Manila.

History

The Saint Francis of Assisi College (SFAC) is a learning institution offering education from pre-school up to the graduate level. Founded in 1981 with about 80 pre-school pupils, SFAC now consists of more than 10,000 students spread across nine campuses in the Southern Luzon area. Main Campus is located in Admiral Village, Talon III, Las Piñas. Saint Francis of Assisi College (SFAC) is one of the prime educational institutions with Home Study Culture in the Philippines that began in the early 1990s where the program was not yet recognized in the country.

Campuses

 SFAC Las Piñas (Main Campus)
 SFAC Bacoor Campus
 SFAC Taguig Campus
 SFAC Alabang Campus
 SFAC Dasmariñas Campus
 SFAC Southwoods Campus
 SFAC Santa Rosa, Laguna Campus
 Saint Anthony School Los Baños, Laguna

Basic Education Program 
Preschool Program
Nursery
Pre-Kindergarten
Kindergarten
Elementary Grades 1-6
Science Elementary Grades 4-6
High School
Research-Enhanced Junior High School, Grade 7 - Grade 10
Franciscan Home Study Program, Grade 7 - Grade 10
Senior High School, Grade 11 - Grade 12
Science & Technology, Engineering & Mathematics (STEM)
Accountancy, Business and Management (ABM)
Humanities and Social Sciences (HUMSS)
General Academics (GAs)
Technical, Vocational and Livelihood (TVL) - Home Economics (HE)
Technical, Vocational and Livelihood (TVL) - Information and Communications Technology (ICT)

Higher Education Program 
 School of Nursing
Bachelor of Science in Nursing (BSN) (4 years)
 School of Computer Studies
Bachelor of Science in Computer Science BSCS (4 years)
School of Engineering
Bachelor of Science in Electronics and Communications Engineering BSCECE (5 years)
Bachelor of Science in Computer Engineering BSCoE (5 years)
Bachelor of Science in Electronics Engineering BSEE (5 years)
School of Business Administration
Bachelor of Science in Business Administration (BSBA) (4 years)
Bachelor of Science in Hotel and Restaurant Management (BSHRM) (4 years)
School of Education and Liberal Arts
Bachelor of Elementary Education (BEEd) (4 years)
Bachelor of Secondary Education (BSEd) (4 years)
Bachelor of Arts in Psychology (ABPsy) (4 years)
Graduate Studies
Master of Arts in Education - Major in Educational Management (MaEd)
Master of Arts in education - Major in Guidance and Counseling (MaEd)
Master in Business Management (MBM)

Notable alumni
 Ranidel de Ocampo - former professional basketball player and assistant coach for TNT Tropang Giga of Philippine Basketball Association (PBA)
 Rayver Cruz or Raymond Oliver Cruz Ilustre - Television artist at ABS-CBN and GMA
 Marian Rivera - Dantes - Television artist, endorser and model
 Sitti Navarro - The "Filipino Bossa Nova", singer and song writer
 Wesley So - World chess grandmaster
 Rodjun Cruz - Television artist at ABS-CBN and GMA, dancer
 Ervin Sotto - 2004 PBA Draft player and former professional basketball player
 Jondan Salvador - Professional Basketball Player
 Kyline Alcantara - Television artist at ABS-CBN and GMA
 Kai Sotto - a Filipino professional basketball player

Affiliations

 National Athletic Association of Schools, Colleges and Universities(NAASCU)
 National Collegiate Athletic Association (Philippines) South
 Universities and Colleges of Luzon Athletic Association
 National Capital Region Universities and Colleges of Luzon Athletic Association (NCRUCLAA)

References

External links
 
 Saint Francis of Assisi College Systems FB Page
 Saint Francis of Assisi College - Alabang
 Saint Francis of Assisi College - Las Piñas

Catholic universities and colleges in Metro Manila
Catholic elementary schools in Metro Manila
Catholic secondary schools in Metro Manila
Education in Las Piñas